Richard Ewell Thornton (January 7, 1865 – March 27, 1928) was an American lawyer and Democratic politician who served as a member of the Virginia Senate, representing the state's 14th district from 1908 to 1920.

References

External links

1865 births
1928 deaths
University of Virginia alumni
Democratic Party Virginia state senators
20th-century American politicians
People from Brentsville, Virginia